The New Hampshire Avenue–Maryland Line, designated Route K6, is a daily bus route operated by the Washington Metropolitan Area Transit Authority between Fort Totten station on the Red, Green, and Yellow lines of the Washington Metro and White Oak Shopping Center. The line operates every 10 - 30 minutes at all times. Route K6 trips are roughly 40 - 50 minutes.

Background
Route K6 operates daily between Fort Totten station and White Oak Shopping Center via New Hampshire Avenue providing service to residents between the two points. Route K6 currently operates out of Bladensburg division. The line originally operated out of Montgomery division until 2019.

K6 stops

History
K6 originally began operating as part of the Capital Transit Company "New Hampshire Avenue" Bus Line in 1964, between White Oak Shopping Center in White Oak, MD & Metro Center in Downtown Washington D.C. mostly operating along Columbia Pike, New Hampshire Avenue, the White Oak FDA/FRC Building, and North Capitol Street NW. K6 eventually became a WMATA Metrobus route on February 4, 1973 when WMATA bought all four failing private bus companies that operated throughout the Washington D.C. Metropolitan Area and merged them all together to form its own, Metrobus System.

1978 Changes
On February 19, 1978 after Fort Totten station opened, K6 was truncated to only operate between the White Oak Shopping Center & Fort Totten station. The remaining segment of K6's original routing between Fort Totten and Metro Center was replaced by WMATA's brand new route K4, which was designed to operate between Fort Totten and Metro Center.

2013 Changes
On December 29, 2013, route K6 discontinued all service to the Food and Drug Administration and instead remained straight along New Hampshire Avenue. Service would be replaced by route K9 which was extended from Northwest Park.

2016 Changes
When the Takoma Langley Crossroads Transit Center opened on December 22, 2016, the K6 was rerouted, along with several other Metrobus, Ride On buses, Shuttle UM and TheBus routes, to serve the newly opened Transit Center. Route K6 would serve Bus Bay G alongside route K9.

Incidents
 On December 30, 2013, around 3:30 PM, a K6 driver was killed when her bus began rolling without anybody on board and pinned the driver to a wall at White Oak Shopping Center. Preliminary investigation indicates that the driver attempted to engage the brake by reaching through the driver's window before becoming pinned to the bus. The driver suffered serious injuries and was pronounced dead several hours later.
 On April 14, 2020, a car crashed into the back of a K6 bus around 10 p.m. Monday night leaving the three people inside the car pinned and severely injured.

References

K6